Phalera  may refer to:

 Phalera (moth), a genus of moths
 Phalera (harness), a piece of horse harness, frequently decorated in antiquity
 Phalera (military decoration), a sculpted disk of precious metal worn on the breastplate as a form of medal by soldiers of the Roman Empire

See also 
 Mirror armour - similar oriental armour